Dennis E. Leh (born January 4, 1946) is a Republican former member of the Pennsylvania House of Representatives. He was born in Pottstown.

Biography
Leh is a 1964 graduate of Pottstown High School. 

He served in the United States Army from 1965 to 1967, attaining the rank of sergeant in the Military Police Corps. 

He completed a four-year Tool and die maker apprenticeship, and worked for Doehler-Jarvis, Farley Industries. He then became the owner of Leh Tool Service, and operated his business for twenty years.

In 1994, he proposed the three-strikes laws against persistent violent offenders.

References

External links
 official PA House profile (archived)
 official Party website (archived)

Living people
Republican Party members of the Pennsylvania House of Representatives
1946 births